Vladimir Kryukov may refer to:

 Vladimir Kryukov (rower) (born 1925), Russian rower
 Vladimir Kryukov (general) (1897–1959), Soviet Army general